Kamel Chafni (Arabic: كمال الشافني; born 11 June 1982) is a professional footballer who plays as a midfielder.

Born in France, he represented Morocco at international level; he made his first appearance in a friendly match against Benin on 20 August 2008.

External links
 
 
  mercato365.com

References

1982 births
Living people
French sportspeople of Moroccan descent
Moroccan footballers
French footballers
Footballers from Bordeaux
Association football midfielders
Morocco international footballers
2013 Africa Cup of Nations players
Ligue 1 players
Ligue 2 players
UAE First Division League players
UAE Pro League players
Racing Besançon players
LB Châteauroux players
AC Ajaccio players
AJ Auxerre players
Stade Brestois 29 players
Al Dhafra FC players
Al Urooba Club players
Al Hamriyah Club players
Al-Ittihad Kalba SC players
Moroccan expatriate footballers
Moroccan expatriate sportspeople in the United Arab Emirates
Expatriate footballers in the United Arab Emirates
French expatriate sportspeople in the United Arab Emirates
French expatriate footballers